HSC Sea Speed Jet is a high speed catamaran ferry built by Incat for Sea Containers in 1990. It has been owned by Sea and Sun Maritime Co. since 2014. The vessel is currently operated by Seajets.

Sea Speed Jet was the first 74-metre wave piercing catamaran built and the first car carrying catamaran built by Incat.

History
Sea Speed Jet was launched as SeaCat Tasmania in October 1990. The vessel's first spell in service was on charter to Tasmanian Ferry Services and was deployed on the route between Port Welshpool and George Town until 1992 when the vessel moved to the English Channel operating between Dover and Calais and also Folkestone and Boulogne for Hoverspeed. In the same year the vessel moved back to Tasmanian Ferry Services where it spent seven months on charter before returning to the Channel in mid-1993 and being renamed SeaCat Calais.

The vessel then went on a five-year charter to Ferry Lineas Argentinas operating between Montevideo and Buenos Aires. The vessel was renamed to Atlantic II. In 1998 the vessel returned the Channel again (as Atlantic II) and it was deployed on the Dover to Calais route.

In May 2000 the vessel was renamed Croazia Jet and operated for SNAV between Ancona and Split. Just over a year later the vessel was laid up for around six months before making its third return to the Channel. It was renamed SeaCat France the vessel was once again deployed on the Dover to Calais route.

In 2005 the vessel was chartered to Emeraude Ferries - being renamed Emeraude France. The vessel was deployed between St Malo and Jersey for two months before the charter ended and the vessel was laid up in Sunderland until 2007 when it was sold to Maritime Charter Sales Ltd and chartered to the Isle of Man Steam Packet Company to cover for sister vessel Sea Express 1 which had been damaged in an accident on the River Mersey.

Emeraude France spent six months on charter to the Steam Packet Company and provided a reliable service during the Centenary of the Isle of Man TT in 2007 operating mainly on the Douglas to Dublin and Belfast routes and occasionally serving Liverpool and Heysham. She also covered the special excursion cruises. In September 2007 the vessel's charter ended and Emeraude France moved to Tilbury for lay up until it was acquired by Sea and Sun Maritime Co. in 2014 and renamed Superfast Cat. It was later renamed Sea Speed Jet and entered service with Seajets.

References

Ships of Seajets
Ships built by Incat
Incat high-speed craft
1990 ships